U.S. cities with large Irish American populations. The city with the highest Irish population is Boston, Massachusetts.

Large cities with the highest percentage of Irish ancestry
 Boston, Massachusetts 22.8%
Pittsburgh, Pennsylvania 16.2%
 Philadelphia, Pennsylvania 14.2%
 Louisville, Kentucky 13.2%
 Portland, Oregon 11.9% 
 Seattle, Washington 11.65% 
 Buffalo, New York  11.23%
 Nashville, Tennessee 9.8%
 Kansas City, Missouri  9.66%
 Raleigh, North Carolina 9.5%
 Cleveland, Ohio  9.43%
 Saint Paul, Minnesota - 9.4%
 Baltimore, Maryland  9.14%
 Cincinnati, Ohio  9.05%
 Austin, Texas 8.5%
 Charlotte, North Carolina 8.4%
 Chicago, Illinois 8%
 Memphis, Tennessee 7%
 New Orleans, Louisiana 6.8%

Medium-size cities
 Weymouth, Massachusetts - 45.5%
 Quincy, Massachusetts - 33.5%
 Scranton, Pennsylvania - 30.3%
 Albany, New York - 18.1%
 Fayetteville, Arkansas - 15.21%
 Charleston, South Carolina - 14%
 Savannah, Georgia - 13.8%
 Knoxville, Tennessee - 13.5%
 Erie, Pennsylvania - 12.4%
 Omaha, Nebraska - 11.9%
 Syracuse, New York - 12.4%
 Columbia, South Carolina - 10.1%
 Huntsville, Alabama - 10.2%
 Little Rock, Arkansas - 9.6%
 Lowell, Massachusetts - 9.4%
 Mobile, Alabama - 8.7%
 Shreveport, Louisiana - 7%
 Baton Rouge, Louisiana - 6.4%

Small cities, towns, and villages
 Scituate, Massachusetts - 61.5%
 Holly Bluff, Mississippi - 58.33%
 Almond, North Carolina - 50%
 Salem, Alabama - 47.3%
 Braintree, Massachusetts - 46.8%
 Marshfield, Massachusetts - 46.7%
 Belmont, Louisiana - 45.56%
 Pearl River, New York - 45.75%
 Milton, Massachusetts - 44.7%
 Hull, Massachusetts - 44% 
 Walpole, Massachusetts - 43.0%
 Duxbury, Massachusetts - 41.4%
 Vaucluse, South Carolina - 40.62%
 Crum Lynne, Pennsylvania - 39.2%
 Gloucester City, New Jersey - 38.8%
 Fackler, Alabama - 38.16%
 Drexel Hill, Pennsylvania - 37.9%
 Cleary, Mississippi - 32.3%
 Iron City, Tennessee - 31.3%
 Oak Lawn, Illinois - 30.4%
 Waldwick, New Jersey - 30.1%
 Puckett, Mississippi - 29%
 Troy, New York - 24.3%
 Butte, Montana - 23.6%
 McEwen, Tennessee - 22.7%
 Albany, Louisiana - 22.5%
 Abbeville, Mississippi - 21.9%
 Havertown, Pennsylvania - 21.7% 
 Erin, Tennessee - 21.0%
 Hester, Louisiana - 18.4%
 Hernando, Mississippi - 18.1%
 Greenwood Village, Colorado
 Brandon, Mississippi - 16.5%

See also
 List of Irish-American communities
 Lists of U.S. cities with large ethnic minority populations
 Irish in Omaha, Nebraska

References

Irish-American culture
Irish Americans